Temnocyon is an extinct genus of bear-dogs endemic to North America.

The first fossils are recorded in North America at Logan Butte in the John Day beds of Oregon, in the Sharps Formation of the Wounded Knee area, South Dakota, and in the Gering Formation at Wildcat Ridge, Nebraska. These early temnocyonines attained the size of coyotes or small wolves (15–30 kg) and are identified by a uniquely specialized dentition. The last documented occurrences of temnocyonines are found in sediments in northwest Nebraska and southeastern Wyoming.

References

Bear dogs
Oligocene caniforms
Miocene bear dogs
Aquitanian genus extinctions
Cenozoic mammals of North America
White River Fauna
Oligocene genus first appearances
Prehistoric carnivoran genera